Leopold "Leo" Chenal (born October 26, 2000) is an American football linebacker for the Kansas City Chiefs of the National Football League (NFL). He played college football at Wisconsin.

Early life and high school career
Chenal grew up in West Sweden township and attended school in the Frederic district. He open enrolled as a freshman to nearby town Grantsburg, Wisconsin to attend Grantsburg High School, where he played both running back and linebacker. As a senior, Chenal rushed for 2,038 yards and 42 touchdowns with 226 receiving yards and three touchdowns on offense and had 120 tackles and seven tackles for loss on defense. He was named both the small-school Offensive and Defensive Player of the Year by Wisconsin Football Coaches Association and the state Gatorade Football Player of the Year. Chenal finished his high school career with 3,706 rushing yards and 68 touchdowns and 1,300 receiving yards and 17 touchdown receptions on offense and with 385 tackles, 55 tackles for loss, seven sacks, and three interceptions on defense.

College career
Chenal joined the Wisconsin Badgers as an early enrollee. He played in 11 games during his freshman season and had 20 tackles with two tackles for loss and one sack. As a sophomore, he was named honorable mention All-Big Ten Conference after finishing the season with 46 tackles, six tackles for loss, 3.0 sacks, one forced fumble and one interception in seven games during Wisconsin's COVID-19-shortened 2020 season. Chenal was named the Butkus–Fitzgerald Linebacker of the Year and first-team All-Big Ten as a junior.

On January 3, 2022, Chenal announced that he would forgo his senior year to enter the 2022 NFL Draft.

Professional career

Chenal was selected in the third round (103rd overall) by the Kansas City Chiefs in the 2022 NFL Draft. Chenal made his NFL debut in the Chiefs' regular season opener against the Arizona Cardinals. He earned his first start in Week 5 against the Las Vegas Raiders. He recorded his first professional sack in Week 10 against the Jacksonville Jaguars. He finished his rookie season with 35 total tackles and one sack in 17 games, of which he started eight. Chenal recorded six tackles and a sack as the Chiefs won Super Bowl LVII against the Philadelphia Eagles 38–35.

References

External links
 Kansas City Chiefs bio
Wisconsin Badgers bio

2000 births
Living people
People from Grantsburg, Wisconsin
Players of American football from Wisconsin
American football linebackers
Wisconsin Badgers football players
Kansas City Chiefs players